Brachypus may refer to:

 Brachypus (plant), a genus of plants in the family Brassicaceae
 Brachypus (bird), or Pycnonotus, a genus of birds
 Brachypus (crinoid), or Permobrachypus, a genus of crinoids